The Army Appropriations Act of 1901 (enacted 2 March 1901 by Pres. William McKinley), enacted in the years following the Spanish–American War and the resulting 1898 Treaty of Paris, is primarily known for:
 the Platt Amendment (31 Stat. 897), defining the terms of Cuban independence
 the Spooner Amendment (31 Stat. 910), defining the terms of Philippine independence

1901 in American law
United States federal appropriations legislation